Paraspur is a village development committee in Banke District in Lumbini Province of south-western Nepal. At the time of the 1991 Nepal census it had a population of 3,201 and had 604 houses in the town. Now, it is a part (Ward No.17) of Nepalgunj sub-metropolitan city.

References

Populated places in Banke District